Bill Whitmore  is an American former college basketball coach and was the head men's basketball coach at Vermont from 1981 to 1986.

Coaching career
After graduation from St. Bonaventure, Whitmore coached high school basketball in New York before accepting a position as an assistant coach at Vermont under Peter Salzberg. After Salzberg stepped down prior to te 1981 season, Whitmore was elevated to head coach. His teams failed to win over 10 games in his five years at the helm. Whitmore stepped down, and was replaced by Tom Brennan.

Whitmore is known for giving Stan Van Gundy his first coaching job, while also offering John Calipari his first paid coaching job, before Calipari had a change of heart and returned to Kansas to continue to work under Larry Brown.

Personal
After coaching, Whitmore has served in various athletic administration roles at the high school level. Currently, he is the athletic director at Bedford High School in New Hampshire. Whitmore's son Nick is a former college assistant coach San Francisco, and is the current head varsity boys' basketball coach at New Hampton School.

Head coaching record

College

References

Living people
American men's basketball coaches
College men's basketball head coaches in the United States
High school basketball coaches in the United States
St. Bonaventure Bonnies men's basketball coaches
St. Bonaventure University alumni
Vermont Catamounts men's basketball coaches
Place of birth missing (living people)
Year of birth missing (living people)